Johnny Khamis is an American politician from San Jose, California and was a member of the San Jose City Council, representing District 10.  

Khamis is a Christian of Palestinian descent. He grew up in San Jose and attended local public schools, graduating from Oak Grove High School. He is a graduate of San Jose State University in Business Management and Communication. He is the former CEO and founder of Western Benefit Solutions, a San Jose-based firm that deals in insurance benefit plan consulting. 

He was a member of the Republican Party, until changing his registration to no party preference in protest of the Trump administration family separation policy. City council positions are officially nonpartisan per California law.  With his swearing-in on December 31, 2012, he became the first Arab-American to take office for the city of San Jose. He is the former regional director of the California Congress of Republicans, the former chair of the Santa Clara County Human Relations Commission, and the former chair of the San Jose Small Business Development Commission during his time as a councilmember.

Elections 
In 2022, Khamis was a candidate in the 2022 Santa Clara County Board of Supervisors election for the District 1 seat. He came in second in the primary election and he lost in the general election to Sylvia Arenas.

On March 3, 2020, in the primary election, Khamis lost when he placed 5th place in his race for California's 15th State Senate district behind Republican Robert Howell, Democrat Nora Campos, and the top two vote getters who would move on to general election in November: Ann Ravel who placed 2nd and Dave Cortese who placed in 1st place. Cortese would go on to win the general election.

In the 2012 San Jose city council election, Khamis got the highest vote total of the six candidates in the June primary and won the November general election 52.6% to 47.4%. In his re-election bid in 2016, he received 76% of the vote in the primary election, winning outright forgoing a November general election.

References

External links
 https://web.archive.org/web/20131029193249/http://www.sanjoseca.gov/index.aspx?nid=1244

California Republicans
Living people
San Jose City Council members
San Jose State University alumni
American politicians of Palestinian descent
Year of birth missing (living people)